is a Japanese football player. He plays for Verspah Oita.

Club statistics
Updated to 23 February 2018.

References

External links
Profile at Fujieda MYFC

1993 births
Living people
Tokai Gakuen University alumni
Association football people from Chiba Prefecture
Japanese footballers
J3 League players
Japan Football League players
Blaublitz Akita players
Fujieda MYFC players
Verspah Oita players
Fukui United FC players
Association football midfielders